Mount Gipps Station most commonly known as Mount Gipps is a pastoral lease that operates as a sheep station in north west New South Wales.

Currently occupying an area of  the property is still operating as a sheep station but also as a farmstay for tourists. The area is arid and most water is pumped from bores, though Stephens Creek runs through the property and has semi-permanent water-holes. The property is composed of gibber plains, large areas of saltbush and mulga and sandy creek beds surrounded by coolibah trees. The old station homestead is now the site of the Broken Hill Royal Flying Doctor Service.

The station was established around 1863 by the Barrier Ranges Company which included George Urquhart who owned neighbouring Kinchega Station. The property takes its name from Mount Gibbs that was named by Charles Sturt during his expedition of 1844. Mount Gipps was the first established station in the Barrier Range area and one of the first west of the Darling River.

The run was taken up in 1866 by McCredie and Cunningham who occupied an area of  including an outstation at Stephens Creek; the pair later sold it to James McCulloch and Robert Sellar. James McCulloch's cousin, George McCulloch, later became manager and was given a 2/16 share in the Mount Gipps Pastoral and Mineral Company; amongst his employees was a young Sidney Kidman who was employed at Mount Gipps as a roustabout and bullock driver.

In 1883 a boundary rider from Mount Gipps named Charles Rasp discovered outcrops of mineralization on the property at Broken Hill in the Barrier Range, and with two fellow workers, pegged a claim, then at McCulloch's instigation formed the Syndicate of Seven to peg out a further six claims on what turned out to be one of the world's richest lodes of silver, lead and zinc, forming BHP.

See also
List of ranches and stations

References

Stations (Australian agriculture)
Pastoral leases in New South Wales
1863 establishments in Australia